The 2015 Egypt Cup Final decided the winner of the 2015 Egypt Cup, the 83rd season of Egypt's premier football cup. It has played on 21 September 2015.

Zamalek, the winners of the previous final, faced Al Ahly; both of the clubs share rivalry in Cairo; Zamalek won the match 2–0 to win their third consecutive title and thereby claiming their 24th title.

The winner was going to play against the 2014–15 Egyptian Premier League winner in the 2015 Egyptian Super Cup; however as Zamalek won both the league and the cup they played against Al Ahly, the runner-up in both the league and the cup, in the Super Cup. The winner was also going to qualify for the 2016 CAF Confederation Cup but as both of the teams qualified for the 2016 CAF Champions League the berth was given to the 4th placed team in the league, Misr El Makasa.

Background
It was the 47th time that Al Ahly reach the final (most recently in 2010 against Haras El Hodoud) winning a record of 35 title (two shared with Zamalek). Zamalek has reached the final 37 times; winning the Cup 23 times (two shared with Al Ahly).

Route to the final

Al Ahly
Al Ahly, of the Premier League, started the tournament on the first round on 15 January 2015, playing home to Second Division team Tahta, winning 6–1 with goals by Walid Soliman, Abdallah El Said, Mohamed Nagieb, Mohamed Rizk and Emad Moteab (2). On 13 August 2015 they played their second match at home to El Gouna, most of El Gouna players was from the youth academy; in result Al Ahly won 13–0, the game started with an early own goal from Shams El Dien Said then El Said scored two goals in two minutes, other goals scored by John Antwi (4), Ramadan Sobhy, Ahmed Fathy, Malick Evouna, Gedo, Hussein Sayed and Hossam Ghaly. The quarterfinal match played on 16 August 2015 at home against Ittihad El Shorta, the math ended 5–0 with goals from El Said, Sobhy, Moamen Zakaria and Moteab (2). On 16 September 2015 their semifinal match was also at home against Petrojet, Mohamed Ragab gave Petrojet the lead by a quick counter-attack in the middle of the first half, but Sobhy scored the equalizer on the 42nd minute; in the second half Sayed scored on the 70th minute and Fathy ended the match with a beautiful solo-goal on the 89th minute.

Zamalek
Zamalek, also of Premier League, started the tournament on the first round on 11 January 2015 at home against Second Division team Nogoom El Mostakbal, Zamalek has played the match with the reserve team, resulting Mohamed Hamam scoring the opener for Nogoom Al Mostakbal early in the second half; giving them the lead for only 7 minutes as Ahmed Ali Kamel scored the equalizer on the 59th minute and the winning goal on the 87th minute. The second match was on 15 August 2015 at home against Haras El Hodoud, the match ended 3–1, Mostafa Fathi scored two goal in two minutes and Ibrahim Abdel-Khaleq scored a goal in the 87th minute, Mohamed Ramadan scored the only goal for Haras El Hodoud from the spot. The third match was on 18 August 2015, they traveled  to Alexandria to play against Al Ittihad, the match ended goalless but they won on penalties. The semifinal played away on 17 September 2015 against previous runner-up Smouha, Smouha played the game focusing on the attack but Genesh saved all of the attempts on goal, resulting the match to end goalless, Zamalek won the match 4–3 by penalties.

Match

References

2015
Cup Final
EC 2015
EC 2015